The 2016 Baden-Württemberg state election was held on 13 March 2016 to elect the members of the 15th Landtag of Baden-Württemberg. The incumbent government of The Greens and the Social Democratic Party (SPD) led by Minister-President Winfried Kretschmann lost its majority.

The Greens achieved a 6% swing and became the largest party in a state legislature for the first time. The Christian Democratic Union (CDU), which had previously been the largest party, lost a third of its voteshare and fell to second place. Alternative for Germany (AfD) contested its first state election in Baden-Württemberg, debuting at 15%. The SPD lost half its voteshare and fell to fourth place with 12.7%.

After the election, the Greens formed a coalition with the CDU, and Kretschmann was re-elected as Minister-President.

Campaign and issues
The Greens campaigned to keep Minister-President Winfried Kretschmann in office. Their central issues were energy, economics, and education. The CDU aimed to put an end to the green-red state government and usher in its own leading candidate Guido Wolf to head the state government. Themes in focus for the CDU were education policy, internal security, and the issue of infrastructure, including high-speed internet. The SPD, led by Nils Schmid, wanted to win more votes to continue the existing government coalition with The Greens. The SPD's campaign mainly focused on "good jobs", educational equality, and more time for the family. The electoral goal of the FDP, led by Hans-Ulrich Rülke, was to repeat its entry into the state parliament and possibly be involved in a governing coalition. They promised better education, the strengthening of the local business, and improvement of mobility. The AfD party campaigned to be elected into the state parliament for the first time. Its leading candidate Jörg Meuthen saw migration policy as an important election issue, alongside education, security, and energy transition.

The election campaign was overshadowed by the European migrant crisis. In the crisis, Kretschmann supported the policies of Chancellor Angela Merkel. Kretschmann said he saw no other person who could keep Europe together as Angela Merkel did. "Therefore, I pray every day that the Chancellor remains healthy." CDU candidate Wolf also emphasized support for Merkel's "European solution" in the crisis, but in February 2016 tried to win more conservative voters by a joint proposal along with Rhineland-Palatinate CDU candidate Julia Klöckner for daily refugee quotas and border centers for migrants, which put additional pressure on Merkel.

Parties
The table below lists parties represented in the previous Landtag of Baden-Württemberg.

Opinion polls

Key

Results

< 2011    > 2021  
|-
|colspan=7 | 
|-
! colspan="2" rowspan="2" style="text-align:left; background:#e9e9e9; width:400px;"|Party
!  style="background:#e9e9e9; text-align:center;" colspan="3"|Popular vote
!  style="background:#e9e9e9; text-align:center;" colspan="3"|Seats
|-
!  style="text-align:right; background:#e9e9e9; width:60px;"|Votes
!  style="text-align:right; background:#e9e9e9; width:40px;"|%
!  style="text-align:right; background:#e9e9e9; width:50px;"|+/–
!  style="text-align:right; background:#e9e9e9; width:30px;"|Seats
!  style="text-align:right; background:#e9e9e9; width:30px;"|+/–
|-

|  Bündnis 90/Die Grünen || 1,622,631 || 30.3 || 6.1 || 47 || 11
|-
|  Christlich Demokratische Union Deutschlands – CDU || 1,447,249 || 27.0 || 12.0 || 42 || 18
|-
|  Alternative für Deutschland – AfD || 809,311 || 15.1 || 15.1 || 23 || 23
|-
|  Sozialdemokratische Partei Deutschlands – SPD || 679,872 || 12.7 || 10.4 || 19 || 16
|-
|  Freie Demokratische Partei – FDP || 445,430 || 8.3 || 3.0 || 12 || 5
|-
|  Die Linke || 156,211 || 2.9 || 0.1 || 0 || 
|-
|  Allianz für Fortschritt und Aufbruch – ALFA || 54,764 || 1.0 || 1.0 || 0 || 
|-
|  Ökologisch-Demokratische Partei – ÖDP || 38,509 || 0.7 || 0.2 || 0 || 
|-
|  Nationaldemokratische Partei Deutschlands – NPD || 23,605 || 0.4 || 0.6 || 0 || 
|-
|  Piratenpartei || 21,773 || 0.4 || 0.6 || 0 || 
|-
| style="background:white;"| || align=left |Other parties||  ||  ||  ||  || 
|- style="background:#e9e9e9;"
| style="text-align:right;" colspan="2"| Valid votes
| 5,360,351
| 99.0
| 0.4
| colspan="2" rowspan="2" style="color:#bab9b9;"|
|- style="background:#e9e9e9;"
| style="text-align:right;" colspan="2"| Invalid votes
| 51,950
| 1.0
| 0.4
|- style="background:#e9e9e9;"
| style="text-align:right;" colspan="2"| Totals and voter turnout
| 5,412,301	
| 70.4 
| 4.2
| 143
| 5
|- style="background:#bab9b9;"
| colspan="2" | Electorate
| 7,685,778
| 100.00
| —
| colspan=2|
|-
| colspan="11" style="text-align:left;"| Source: Landeswahlleiter
|}

Aftermath
In the prior election of 2011, the Green/SPD coalition obtained a majority (73 of 138) of votes in the Landtag, including two opposition votes; however after the 2016 vote, the coalition fell short of a majority, with a combined total of 66 seats (72 needed for a majority). Kretschmann's popularity propelled the Green Party to a gain of 11 seats, making history as the first time the Green party has been the largest party in State-level election results. However, the Greens' coalition partner, the SPD, lost 16 seats, thus depriving the Greens' of a clear majority of leftists.

There were several possible and probable working majorities among the five parties in the Landtag. Expanding the existing coalition into a three-party "traffic light" coalition (green-red-yellow) by including the FDP would have given the administration a working majority of 6.  Coalitions with AfD appeared unlikely: a CDU-AfD coalition would be 7 short of a majority in the Landtag, so would have also needed to include the FDP to make a majority and remove Kretschmann as minister-president. Removal of Kretschmann was unlikely; CDU leader Guido Wolf briefly sought to get the Social Democrats into a right-of-centre coalition with the FDP (with Wolf as state minister-president), but his SPD counterpart Nils Schmid pointed out that such a coalition would frustrate voters due to the personal popularity of Kretschmann. If it were possible to elect the minister-president directly, Kretschmann would have won an outright majority according to polls; he was even favored by 45% of CDU supporters.

In May 2016, the Landtag confirmed Kretschmann's leadership in a secret ballot. He won 82 votes leading a "green-black" coalition with a nominal majority of 89 Landestag members (Green 47, CDU 42). A similar "black-green" coalition headed by the CDU has governed in Hesse since the similarly indecisive 2013 elections, but this is the first time the Green Party is the lead coalition partner in a coalition with the CDU (previously, they led a coalition with the SPD). Kretschmann formed the Cabinet Kretschmann II as the state government.

References

External links
 Electoral programs of all parties, Landeszentrale für politische Bildung Baden-Württemberg, in German

2016 elections in Germany
2016
March 2016 events in Germany